Thyasiridae is a family of bivalve molluscs, including the cleft clams, in the order Lucinida.

Genera and species
 Adontorhina S. S. Berry, 1947
 Adontorhina cyclia S. S. Berry, 1947
 Adontorhina keegani Barry & McCormack, 2007
 Adontorhina lynnae Valentich-Scott, 2000
 Adontorhina pisum (Dall, 1908)
 Adontorhina similis Barry & McCormack, 2007
 Adontorhina sphaericosa Scott, 1986
 Adontorhina zelayai Valentich-Scott, 2012
 Ascetoaxinus P. G. Oliver & Frey, 2014
 Axinodon A. E. Verrill and Bush, 1898
 Axinodon redondoensis (T. A. Burch, 1941)
 Axinodon symmetros (Jeffreys, 1876)
 Axinopsida Keen and Chavan, 1951
 Axinopsida cordata (A. E. Verrill and Bush, 1898)
 Axinopsida orbiculata (G. O. Sars, 1878)
 Axinopsida serricata (Carpenter, 1864)
 Axinopsida viridis (Dall, 1901)
 Axinulus A. E. Verrill and Bush, 1898
 Axinulus careyi Bernard, 1979
 Axinulus eumyaria (M. Sars, 1870)
 Axinulus redondoensis (T. A. Burch, 1941)
 Axinus J. Sowerby, 1821
 Channelaxinus Valentich-Scott & Coan, 2012
 Conchocele Gabb, 1866
Conchocele bisecta (Conrad, 1849) – giant cleft clam
 Conchocele disjuncta Gabb, 1866
 Genaxinus Iredale, 1930
 Genaxinus cookianus Fleming, 1950
 Genaxinus otagoensis (Suter, 1913)
 Leptaxinus A. E. Verrill and Bush, 1898
 Leptaxinus incrassatus (Jeffreys, 1876)
 Leptaxinus minutus A. E. Verrill and Bush, 1898
 Maorithyas Fleming, 1950
 Maorithyas flemingi Powell, 1955
 Maorithyas marama Fleming, 1950
 Mendicula Iredale, 1924
 Mendicula ferruginosa (Forbes, 1844)
 Ochetoctena P. G. Oliver, 2014
 Odontogena Cowan, 1964
 Parathyasira Iredale, 1930
 Philis Fischer, 1861
 Prothyasira Iredale, 1930
 Rhacothyas Åström & P. G. Oliver, 2017
Spinaxinus Oliver & Holmes, 2006
Spinaxinus emicatus Oliver, 2013 
Spinaxinus phrixicus Oliver, 2013 
Spinaxinus sentosus Oliver and Holmes, 2006 
 Thyasira Lamarck, 1818
Thyasira alleni Carrozza, 1981
 Thyasira barbarensis (Dall, 1890)
 Thyasira brevis A. E. Verrill and Bush, 1898
 Thyasira croulinensis Jeffreys, 1874
 Thyasira cycladia S. Wood, 1853
 Thyasira cygnus Dall, 1916 – Swan cleft clam
 Thyasira elliptica Verrill and Bush, 1898
 Thyasira equalis (A. E. Verrill and Bush, 1898)
 Thyasira eumyaria M. Sars, 1870
 Thyasira flexuosa (Montagu, 1803)
 Thyasira gouldi (Philippi, 1845)
 Thyasira grandis Verrill and Smith, 1885
 Thyasira granulosa Monterosato, 1874
 Thyasira incrassatus (Jeffreys, 1876)
 Thyasira obsoleta (Verrill and Bush, 1898)
 Thyasira ovoidea Dall, 1889
 Thyasira peroniana peregrina Iredale, 1930
 Thyasira peroniana waikanae Fleming, 1950
 Thyasira plicata Verrill and Smith, 1885
 Thyasira pygmaea Verrill and Bush, 1898
 Thyasira resupina neozelanica (Iredale, 1930)
 Thyasira rotunda Jeffreys, 1881
 Thyasira simplex A. E. Verrill and Bush, 1898
 Thyasira subovata Jeffreys, 1881
 Thyasira subtrigona (Jeffreys, 1858)
 Thyasira succisa (Jeffreys, 1876)
 Thyasira tortuosa Jeffreys, 1881
 Thyasira tricarinata Dall, 1916
 Thyasira triseriata
 Thyasira trisinuata (d'Orbigny, 1842) – Atlantic cleft clam
 Tauraxinus  Sacco, 1901
 Wallerconcha
 Wallerconcha sarae

References

 Powell A. W. B., New Zealand Mollusca, William Collins Publishers Ltd, Auckland, New Zealand 1979 

 
Bivalve families
Taxa named by William Healey Dall